Charles Alexandre Homere Mouton (8 December 1823 – 16 March 1912) was an American politician. Between 1856 and 1859 he served as Lieutenant Governor of Louisiana.

Life
Charles Mouton was born in St. Landry Parish, Louisiana. He was a nephew of Alexandre Mouton (1804-1885) a former Governor of Louisiana and United States Senator. He was also related to Fernand Mouton who was Lieutenant Governor (LTG) of Louisiana between 1916 and 1920. Another family relationship with Marc M. Mouton, LTG of Louisiana between 1940 and 1944 is possible but cannot be verified in the sources. He attended private schools and graduated from St. Charles College in Grand Coteau in Louisiana. Afterwards he studied law and in 1844 he was admitted to the bar. In the following years he practiced as a lawyer in Lafayette, Louisiana. Later he was appointed to the district attorney for the parishes of Lafayette, St. Landry, Vermillion, & Calcasieu. In the years before the beginning of the American Civil War he was the District Judge of this region. During the war he served in the Confederate States Army as Aide-de-camp to his cousin, General Alfred Mouton. After the war he continued working as an attorney. For some years he was district attorney for St. Martin and Iberia Parishes.
 
Politically Charles Mouton joined the Democratic Party. In 1850 he was elected to the Louisiana State Senate and in 1856 he was elected to the office of the Lieutenant Governor of Louisiana. He served in this position between 1856 and 1859 when he resigned. In this function he was the deputy of Governor Robert C. Wickliffe and he presided over the State Senate. After his resignation his position was filled by William F. Griffin, the President Pro Tempore of the State Senate who completed the unfinished term until 1860. Charles Mouton died on 16 March 1912 in the Lafayette Parish, Louisiana.

External links

 Mouton at Genealogy.Com

1823 births
1912 deaths
Lieutenant Governors of Louisiana
Louisiana Democrats
St. Charles College (Louisiana) alumni